This is a list of horror anime television series, films, and OVAs. While not all inclusive, this list contains numerous works that are representative of the genre. For accuracy of the list, the most common English usage is followed by Japanese name and romaji version. The column for year represents the first premiere of the work, in the case of series the year of the first release.

References

Horror
 
Anime